Ryszard Marian Schnepf (1951) is a Polish politician and diplomat.

Early life 
Schnepf was born in Warsaw, Poland on 22 September 1951, to Polish mother, Alicja Szczepaniak-Schnepf (born in 1930), recognised as Righteous among the Nations and father, colonel Maksymilian Schnepf (1920–2003), who until 1968 was head of the communist military office (Studium Wojskowe) at the University of Warsaw.

Ryszard Schnepf graduated from history at the University of Warsaw. He defended doctoral thesis there.

Career 
Since 1978 he has been working as a lecturer at the University of Warsaw. In the early 1990s Schnepf joined the diplomatic service. Between 1991 and 1996 he served as Ambassador to Uruguay and Paraguay and between 2001 and 2005 to Costa Rica. From 2007 to late 2008 he served as the under-secretary of state of Poland, as part of the Foreign Ministry. From 2008 to 2012 he was ambassador to Spain.

On 14 January 2013, Ryszard Schnepf presented his credentials to U.S. President Barack Obama in a formal ceremony at the Oval Office, marking his official recognition as Ambassador of the Republic of Poland to the United States. He served as Poland's Ambassador until July 31, 2016. He was succeeded as Ambassador by Piotr Wilczek.

Honours 

 Grand Cross of the Order of Isabella the Catholic (Spain, 2012)
 Grand Cross of the National Order of Juan Mora Fernández (Costa Rica, 2004)

References

1951 births
Living people
Diplomats from Warsaw
Politicians from Warsaw
Polish people of Jewish descent
Ambassadors of Poland to Uruguay
Ambassadors of Poland to Paraguay
Ambassadors of Poland to Costa Rica
Ambassadors of Poland to Spain
Ambassadors of Poland to the United States
Ambassadors of Poland to the Bahamas
Academic staff of the University of Warsaw
University of Warsaw alumni